Simon Schürch (born 2 December 1990) is a Swiss rower. He won gold at the 2016 Rio Olympics in the men's lightweight four, with the team being coached by New Zealander Ian Wright. He also competed in the Men's lightweight coxless four event at the 2012 Summer Olympics.

Career 
Schürch was part of the Swiss men's lightweight four that won the bronze medal at the 2010 European Championships, with Lucas Tramer, Simon Niepmann and Mario Gyr.  This was the same team that competed at the 2012 Summer Olympics.

Following the Olympics, Schürch and Gyr won silver at the 2013 World and European Championships men's lightweight double sculls.

The Schürch, Gyr, Tramer and Niepmann team then won the men's lightweight coxless four event at the 2015 World and European Championships.  In 2016, they retained their European title  and won the Olympic title.

References

External links
 

1990 births
Living people
People from Zofingen District
Swiss male rowers
Olympic rowers of Switzerland
Rowers at the 2012 Summer Olympics
Rowers at the 2016 Summer Olympics
World Rowing Championships medalists for Switzerland
Olympic gold medalists for Switzerland
Olympic medalists in rowing
Medalists at the 2016 Summer Olympics
Sportspeople from Aargau